Zgornja Ročica is a settlement in the Municipality of Sveta Ana in the Slovene Hills in northeastern Slovenia.

There is a small chapel in the settlement. It was built at the beginning of the 20th century in a Neo-Gothic style.

References

External links
Zgornja Ročica on Geopedia

Populated places in the Municipality of Sveta Ana